Mattersdorf may refer to:
 a town in the former Kingdom of Hungary, now Mattersburg in Austria
 Kiryat Mattersdorf, a neighborhood in Jerusalem, Israel